The Wellington Firebirds are one of six New Zealand men's first-class cricket teams that make up New Zealand Cricket.
It is based in Wellington. It competes in the Plunket Shield first class (4-day) competition, The Ford Trophy domestic one day competition and the Men's Super Smash Twenty20 competition.

Honours
 Plunket Shield (21)
1923–24, 1925–26, 1927–28, 1929–30, 1931–32, 1935–36, 1949–50, 1954–55, 1956–57, 1960–61, 1961–62, 1965–66, 1972–73, 1973–74, 1981–82, 1982–83, 1983–84, 1989–90, 2000–01, 2003–04, 2019–20

 The Ford Trophy (8)
1973–74, 1974–75, 1981–82, 1988–89, 1990–91, 2001–02, 2013–14, 2018–19

 Men's Super Smash (4)
2014–15, 2016–17, 2019–20, 2020–21

Grounds
Home games are usually played at the Basin Reserve ground in Wellington, which is also used by the Old Boys University rugby club during the winter. Wellington also occasionally use Wellington Regional Stadium for day/night matches, and play first-class games at Karori Park when the Basin Reserve is unavailable.

Current squad
Based on squad for the 2022/23 season. Players in bold have international caps.

Notable players

New Zealand 
Matthew Bell
Bob Blair
Graeme Wheeler  (Reserve Bank Governor) 
Don Beard
Ewen Chatfield
Richard Collinge
Jeremy Coney
Martin Crowe
Simon Doull
Bruce Edgar
Grant Elliott
Stephen Fleming
James Franklin
Stephen Gellatly
Evan Gray
Paul Hitchcock
Andrew Jones
Richard Jones
Gavin Larsen
Ervin McSweeney
Andrew Fletcher

Lawrie Miller
Bruce Murray
Chris Nevin
Richard Reid
Jesse Ryder
Barry Sinclair
Bruce Taylor
Eric Tindill
Roger Twose
Robert Vance

England 
Paul Allott
Charlie Shreck
Graham Napier
Scott Borthwick
Jade Dernbach

Australia 
Clarrie Grimmett
Bob Holland
Travis Birt
Brad Hodge

India 
Lakshmipathy Balaji

Bangladesh 
Tamim Iqbal

Canada 
Ian Billcliff

Sri Lanka 
Muttiah Muralitharan

Zimbabwe 
Brendan Taylor

Records
See List of New Zealand first-class cricket records.

References

External links
 Wellington Cricket Association

New Zealand first-class cricket teams
Cricket clubs established in 1873
Cricket in Wellington
Super Smash (cricket)